Archips cantinus is a moth of the family Tortricidae. It is found in Kashmir.

The ground colour of the forewings brownish, sprinkled with rust. The hindwings are pale brownish tinged ferruginous in the apex part and creamer towards the base.

References

External links

Archips
Moths described in 2006
Moths of Asia
Taxa named by Józef Razowski